Boleside is a village in the Scottish Borders area of Scotland, on the B7060, south of Galashiels. It is very close to the place where the Ettrick Water joins the River Tweed.
 
Other places nearby include Abbotsford, Clovenfords, Lindean, Melrose, Midlem, Selkirk, Yair and Yarrowford.

See also
List of places in the Scottish Borders
List of places in Scotland

External links

RCAHMS: Boleside, Galashiels
The velocity of the River Tweed and its Tributaries
Salmon fishing on the Tweed
Hull University, Dept. of Biological Sciences: Biology of the River Tweed
Images of Boleside

Villages in the Scottish Borders